Krzęcin  is a village in Choszczno County, West Pomeranian Voivodeship, in north-western Poland. It is the seat of the gmina (administrative district) called Gmina Krzęcin.

The village has a population of 1,200.

See also
History of Pomerania

References

Villages in Choszczno County